Volker Beck may refer to:

 Volker Beck (athlete) (born 1956), German athlete
 Volker Beck (politician) (born 1960), German politician